Craig Robert Ireland (born 29 November 1975) is a Scottish retired professional footballer.

Ireland began his a career at Aberdeen, although he only made one League Cup appearance during his time at the club. He moved to Dunfermline Athletic in February 1996 for £75,000 and would make 56 appearances in total for the Pars. His spell with Dundee began initially on loan in October 1999, then as a £50,000 transfer that December. In November 1999 he scored one of the goals as Dundee won 2–1 against Rangers at Ibrox. However he did not prove a great success at Dens Park so joined Airdrieonians and Notts County on loan respectively, making a permanent move to the latter.

He continued playing in England after leaving Notts, having spells at Barnsley, Peterborough United and Bristol City. On 13 June 2005 he returned to Scotland, joining Scottish Premier League side Falkirk on a free transfer. He would only play one season for the Bairns, scoring once against Inverness Caledonian Thistle, and spent another on the sidelines before being forced to retire through injury in April 2007.

Honours
Airdrieonians
Scottish Challenge Cup: 2000–01

References

External links

1975 births
Living people
Scottish footballers
Footballers from Dundee
Aberdeen F.C. players
Dunfermline Athletic F.C. players
Dundee F.C. players
Airdrieonians F.C. (1878) players
Notts County F.C. players
Barnsley F.C. players
Peterborough United F.C. players
Bristol City F.C. players
Falkirk F.C. players
Scottish Premier League players
Scottish Football League players
English Football League players
People educated at Harris Academy
Association football defenders